John Ludlow Gould (February 5, 1914 – May 24, 1993) was an American journalist and critic, who wrote commentary about television.

Early life and education
Gould was born in New York City into a socially prominent family and attended the Loomis School.

Career
He started as a copy boy at the New York Herald Tribune in 1932. In 1937, he moved to The New York Times, writing for the drama department and in the 1940s writing also about radio. In 1944 he became the newspaper's radio critic, and in 1948 the chief television reporter and critic. At one point he had eight people working under him. In the early 1960s he was a CBS executive for a short time but returned to the Times.

Gould's columns and reviews (along with those of rival John Crosby of the Herald Tribune) were widely read by decision makers in the fledgling medium of television, and Gould had many professional and personal relationships with prominent industry figures such as Edward R. Murrow and Fred Friendly. He did not hold back harsh criticism, even when The New York Times itself produced its own public affairs program in 1963; he was aware of the potential power of television as a force for social good. His colleagues dubbed him "the conscience of the industry", to his own embarrassment.

Gould lived on MacDougal Street in Greenwich Village and later in Old Greenwich, Connecticut, where, according to his obituary in The New York Times, his office contained "a shortwave radio, two telephones, a small black book of unlisted telephone numbers, and a typewriter". He retired in 1972 and moved to California. He died in Concord. He married Carmen Letitia Lewis in 1938; they had three sons.

Honors
Gould won many awards, including the George Polk memorial award and a Page One award (both 1953), and a special Peabody Award (1957, citing his "fairness, objectivity and authority").

References

1914 births
1993 deaths
American television critics
Critics employed by The New York Times
American male journalists
20th-century American journalists
20th-century American non-fiction writers
People from Old Greenwich, Connecticut
20th-century American male writers
Loomis Chaffee School alumni